Glipa batjanensis is a species of beetle in the genus Glipa. It was described in 1917.

References

batjanensis
Beetles described in 1917